San Isidro is a partido of Buenos Aires Province, Argentina found in the north of Greater Buenos Aires. Its capital is the city of San Isidro.

The founder of San Isidro city was Domingo de Acassuso, who built a cathedral in 1706 dedicated to San Isidro Labrador, having seen him in a dream. Other towns in the municipality are Acassuso, Beccar, Boulougne, Martínez, and Villa Adelina.

In 2010 there were 291,608 inhabitants. San Isidro borders on the partidos of Tigre, Vicente López, San Martín and San Fernando.

Districts
Acassuso
Béccar
Boulogne Sur Mer
Martínez
San Isidro
Villa Adelina

Cathedral

The San Isidro cathedral (Catedral de San Isidro in Spanish) was completed on July 14, 1898. It is located opposite Plaza Mitre in San Isidro's historic quarter.

Sports

Football
San Isidro is home to Club Atlético Acassuso, a football club that currently plays in the regionalised 3rd Division.

Horse racing
San Isidro is home to a historically prominent Jockey Club, that runs San Isidro's world-class race track, the Hipódromo de San Isidro.

Rugby
San Isidro is the national capital of Rugby and home to two of the most important rugby clubs in the country - SIC (San Isidro Club) and CASI (Club Atlético San Isidro).

Sailing
There are a number of sailing clubs on the Río de la Plata.

See also
Hospital Central de San Isidro
Catedral de San Isidro
Colegio Nacional de San Isidro

References

External links

 
San Isidro hipodromo
Tourist information
 San isidro Club Rugby
 Club Atlético San Isidro Rugby
 Club Acassuso Football
 Club Acassuso -Arriba Los Azules Football
 InfoBAN San Isidro

 
Partidos of Buenos Aires Province
States and territories established in 1784
1784 establishments in the Spanish Empire